Buddha Multiplex Hotel & Management also known by BMHM, Gaya is a unit of Buddha Group of Institutions, it is a Teacher Training college situated in Gaya, Bihar, India. The college,  approved by NCTE and UGC for courses B.Ed. & D.El.Ed and affiliated by MMHAPU for B.Ed. & BSEB for D.El.Ed from 2010.

Courses
 B.Ed
 D.El.Ed

See also
 List of teacher education schools in India
 Teacher Training College, Gaya

References

External links
 Official Website : Buddha Multiplex Hotel & Management

Education in Bihar
Teacher education in India
Educational institutions in India with year of establishment missing